Christofer Heimeroth (born 1 August 1981 in Unna, West Germany) is a German former professional footballer who played as a goalkeeper.

Honours

Club
Schalke 04
 DFB-Pokal Runner-up: 2004–05
 UEFA Intertoto Cup: 2003, 2004

References

External links
 

1981 births
Living people
Association football goalkeepers
German footballers
Germany under-21 international footballers
FC Schalke 04 players
FC Schalke 04 II players
Borussia Mönchengladbach players
Bundesliga players
2. Bundesliga players
People from Unna
Sportspeople from Arnsberg (region)
Footballers from North Rhine-Westphalia